Privilege is a 1967 British comedy-drama music science fiction film directed by Peter Watkins and produced by John Heyman. Johnny Speight wrote the story, and Norman Bogner wrote the script. Some of it was filmed on location in Birmingham, England, partly at Birmingham City F.C.'s St Andrew's stadium and at Birmingham Town Hall.

Plot
The story is presented as a narrated documentary, set in a near-future 1970s England, and concerning a disillusioned pop singer, Steven Shorter (Paul Jones), who is the most loved celebrity in the country. His stage show involves him appearing on stage in a jail cell with handcuffs, beaten by police, to the horror and sympathy of the audience. It is described that the two main parties of England have formed a coalition government and encourage the success of Shorter to placate the masses and divert them from political activity. Shorter is consistently monitored and manipulated by handlers consisting of manager Martin Crossley (Jeremy Child), public relations representative Alvin Kirsch (Mark London), record company executive Julie Jordan (Max Bacon), and financial backer Andrew Butler (William Job). Businesses including nightclubs, shopping centers, product brands, and media outlets, carry Shorter's name, demonstrating his appeal to consumers. An artist, Vanessa Ritchie (Jean Shrimpton) has been hired to paint his portrait, and Shorter gravitates to her amidst his loneliness and isolation.

Demands upon Shorter's time and energy increases. He is asked to film a commercial for the country's apple growers, hoping to convince citizens to eat a disproportionately large amount of apples to make up for a surplus supply. More ominously, the collective churches of England strike an arrangement with the government and Shorter's empire to turn him into a messianic leader that will boost church attendance and a sense of national unity. An image change is announced in advance of a huge stadium concert, where he will publicly "repent," no longer perform in handcuffs, and will espouse religious themes in his songs. Shorter's equilibrium becomes more shaky; at a picnic where lobster is served, he absurdly orders hot chocolate to drink, and everyone present in turn orders hot chocolate as well, demonstrating he will be enabled at all times.

The stadium rally has a record attendance, and features militarized performance from various nationalist organizations. A firebrand preacher, Reverend Jeremy Tate, tells the assembled crowd they will be handed cards reading "We Will Conform," rails against the perceived post-war apathy in the country, and demands they repeat the words at his prompting, which they follow. Shorter and his band take the stage, with the band members wearing costumes and assuming poses reminiscent of Nazi Germany. Disabled citizens are given preferential seating to the stage, in the hopes Shorter's music will heal them. When Shorter later watches footage of the rally on television, he is disgusted at the display, and goes on a furniture-breaking tear. He also reveals to Vanessa that contrary to the publicity that his old show was just an act, he bears real scars and bruises from being legitimately assaulted by the mock policemen in the act.

Shorter's record company holds a formal event to give him an achievement award and profess theirs and the nation's love for him. Shorter finally breaks down, inarticulately declaring disgust for the public that cannot see past his charade, and asking to be seen as an individual and not the inflated deity he has been presented as. After stunned silence, the public reacts angrily, and his popularity immediately plummets. Andrew Butler announces his immediate resignation from the Shorter organization, as it is no longer lucrative for his investors. The narrator states that to placate the now-hateful masses, and to preserve the viability of the still extant businesses that carry his name, Shorter's music will be banned from airplay, and he shall not be allowed to speak or perform publicly again.

In postscript, the narrator reveals that there is little left of Shorter's career, and over archival footage of him ("with the soundtrack removed, of course..."), declares, "It is going to be a happy time in England, this year in the future."

Cast
 Paul Jones as Steven Shorter
 Jean Shrimpton as Vanessa Ritchie
 Mark London as Alvin Kirsch
 William Job as Andrew Butler
 Max Bacon as Julie Jordan
 Jeremy Child as Martin Crossley
 James Cossins as Professor Tatham
 Frederick Danner as Marcus Hooper
 Victor Henry as Freddie K
 Arthur Pentelow as Leo Stanley
 Steve Kirby as Squit
 Malcolm Rogers as the Reverend Jeremy Tate
 Doreen Mantle as Miss Crawford
 Michael Graham as Timothy Arbutt
 Michael Barrington as the Bishop of Essex

Gary Glitter auditioned for the lead role that eventually went to Paul Jones. Glitter's career later took off in collaboration with Mike Leander, responsible for the film's music.

Influences 
The film was greatly influenced by the award-winning 1962 Wolf Koenig/Roman Kroitor National Film Board of Canada documentary Lonely Boy, which in cinema verité style follows the growing hysteria surrounding the teen idol Paul Anka, with some scenes (notably that showing Steven Shorter at a table with a venue owner named "Uncle Julie" in both) being almost one-to-one reproductions of the earlier work. Lonely Boy has a different theme, that of a popular singer being merchandised by the music industry. The director of Privilege, Peter Watkins, had made a study of this earlier documentary film to prepare himself for filming Privilege.

Watkins also believes that a scene from Stanley Kubrick's A Clockwork Orange was taken from Privilege.

Musical score 
The film featured Jones performing the title track, "I've Been a Bad, Bad Boy" (a number five hit record) and "Free Me". English singer/songwriter George Bean, playing the primary leader of Shorter's back up band "The Runner Beans," sings the traditional religious songs "Onward Christian Soldiers" and "Jerusalem." A soundtrack album was released in the US and UK.

In 1978, the Patti Smith Group recorded "Free Me" as "Privilege (Set Me Free)" on their album Easter. The recording reached number 72 on the UK singles chart and number 13 on the singles chart in Ireland.

In 1988, Big Audio Dynamite opened their single "Just Play Music!" with an audio sample from the film, of Max Bacon saying "The intro goes something like this: (singing) 'Ba-di-da ba-di-da ba-da, boom boom.'" The accompanying music video opens with the footage from where this dialogue was taken.

"Free Me" was part of the soundtrack of 2019 Guy Ritchie movie The Gentlemen.

Home video release 
Privilege was released on DVD in the UK on the BFI's Flipside imprint.  The disc included two of Peter Watkins's short films: The Forgotten Faces (1961) and The Diary of an Unknown Soldier (1959), as well as the original Privilege trailer.

In the U.S., New Yorker Films released a DVD, under license from Universal and with collaboration with Canadian firm Project X. This DVD release included Lonely Boy as well as an excerpt of an essay on that film as extra features. It is now currently out of print.

A Blu-ray Disc version has also been released in the UK by the BFI, after problems due to "an issue with materials" were resolved.

References

External links
 
 
 
 

1967 films
1960s science fiction films
British satirical films
British science fiction films
Films set in Birmingham, West Midlands
Films directed by Peter Watkins
Films set in the 1970s
Films set in the future
British mockumentary films
British political satire films
Universal Pictures films
Films shot in England
Films about singers
1960s English-language films
1960s British films